Aseraggodes is a genus of soles native to the Indian and Pacific oceans. These small flatfishes are poisonous.

Species
It is by far the most species rich genus in the family Soleidae, as there currently are 54 recognized species:
 Aseraggodes albidus J. E. Randall & Desoutter-Méniger, 2007
 Aseraggodes andersoni J. E. Randall & Bogorodsky, 2013
 Aseraggodes auroculus J. E. Randall, 2005
 Aseraggodes bahamondei J. E. Randall & Meléndez C., 1987 (South Pacific sole)
 Aseraggodes beauforti Chabanaud, 1930
 Aseraggodes borehami J. E. Randall, 1996 (Boreham's sole)
 Aseraggodes brevirostris J. E. Randall & Gon, 2006
 Aseraggodes chapleaui J. E. Randall & Desoutter-Méniger, 2007
 Aseraggodes cheni J. E. Randall & Senou, 2007
 Aseraggodes corymbus J. E. Randall & Bartsch, 2007
 Aseraggodes crypticus J. E. Randall & G. R. Allen, 2007 (Cryptic Sole)
 Aseraggodes cyaneus (Alcock, 1890)
 Aseraggodes cyclurus J. E. Randall, 2005
 Aseraggodes diringeri (Quéro, 1997)
 Aseraggodes dubius M. C. W. Weber, 1913
 Aseraggodes filiger M. C. W. Weber, 1913
 Aseraggodes firmisquamis J. E. Randall & Bartsch, 2005
 Aseraggodes guttulatus Kaup, 1858
 Aseraggodes haackeanus (Steindachner, 1883) (Southern sole)
 Aseraggodes heemstrai J. E. Randall & Gon, 2006
 Aseraggodes heraldi J. E. Randall & Bartsch, 2005
 Aseraggodes herrei Seale, 1940 (Herre's sole)
 Aseraggodes holcomi J. E. Randall, 2002
 Aseraggodes jenny J. E. Randall & Gon, 2006
 Aseraggodes kaianus (Günther, 1880)
 Aseraggodes kimurai J. E. Randall & Desoutter-Méniger, 2007
 Aseraggodes kobensis (Steindachner, 1896)
 Aseraggodes kruppi J. E. Randall & Bogorodsky, 2013
 Aseraggodes lateralis J. E. Randall, 2005
 Aseraggodes lenisquamis J. E. Randall, 2005
 Aseraggodes longipinnis J. E. Randall & Desoutter-Méniger, 2007
 Aseraggodes macronasus J. E. Randall & Bogorodsky, 2013
 Aseraggodes magnoculus J. E. Randall, 2005
 Aseraggodes martine J. E. Randall & Bogorodsky, 2013
 Aseraggodes matsuurai J. E. Randall & Desoutter-Méniger, 2007
 Aseraggodes melanostictus (W. K. H. Peters, 1877) (Mottled sole)
 Aseraggodes microlepidotus M. C. W. Weber, 1913
 Aseraggodes nigrocirratus J. E. Randall, 2005
 Aseraggodes normani Chabanaud, 1930
 Aseraggodes orientalis J. E. Randall & Senou, 2007
 Aseraggodes pelvicus J. E. Randall, 2005
 Aseraggodes ramsaii (J. D. Ogilby, 1889)
 Aseraggodes satapoomini J. E. Randall & Desoutter-Méniger, 2007
 Aseraggodes senoui J. E. Randall & Desoutter-Méniger, 2007
 Aseraggodes sinusarabici Chabanaud, 1931
 Aseraggodes steinitzi Joglekar, 1971
 Aseraggodes suzumotoi J. E. Randall & Desoutter-Méniger, 2007
 Aseraggodes texturatus M. C. W. Weber, 1913
 Aseraggodes therese J. E. Randall, 1996 (Therese's sole)
 Aseraggodes umbratilis (Alcock, 1894)
 Aseraggodes whitakeri Woods, 1966 (Whitaker's sole)
 Aseraggodes winterbottomi J. E. Randall & Desoutter-Méniger, 2007 (Negros sole)
 Aseraggodes xenicus (Matsubara & Ochiai, 1963) (Dwarf sole)
 Aseraggodes zizette J. E. Randall & Desoutter-Méniger, 2007

References

Soleidae
Marine fish genera
Taxa named by Johann Jakob Heckel